Columbus is a Latinized version of the Italian surname "Colombo". It most commonly refers to:

 Christopher Columbus (1451-1506), the Italian explorer
 Columbus, Ohio, capital of the U.S. state of Ohio

Columbus may also refer to:

Places

Extraterrestrial
 Columbus (crater), a crater on Mars
 Columbus (ISS module), the European module for the International Space Station
 Columbus (spacecraft), a program to develop a European space station 1986–1991

Italy
 Columbus (Rome), a residential district

United States
 Columbus, Arkansas
 Columbus, Georgia
 Columbus, Illinois
 Columbus, Indiana, known for modern architecture
 Columbus, Kansas
 Columbus, Kentucky
 Columbus, Minnesota
 Columbus, Mississippi
 Columbus, Missouri
 Columbus, Montana
 Columbus, Nebraska
 Columbus, New Jersey
 Columbus, New Mexico
 Columbus, New York
 Columbus, North Carolina
 Columbus, North Dakota
 Columbus, Ohio, the largest city in United States with this name
 Columbus, Texas
 Columbus, Wisconsin
 Columbus (town), Wisconsin
 Columbus Avenue (disambiguation)
 Columbus Circle, a traffic circle in Manhattan, New York 
 Columbus City (disambiguation)
 Columbus Township (disambiguation)

Persons with the name

Forename
 Columbus Caldwell (1830–1908), American politician 
 Columbus Germain (1827–1880), American politician
 Columbus Short (born 1982), American choreographer and actor

Surname
 Bartholomew Columbus (c. 1461–1515), Christopher Columbus's younger brother
 Chris Columbus (filmmaker) (born 1958), American filmmaker
 Diego Columbus (1479/80–1526), Christopher Columbus' eldest son
 Ferdinand Columbus (1488–1539), Christopher Columbus' second son
 Scott Columbus (1956–2011), long-time drummer for the heavy metal band Manowar

Arts, entertainment, and media

Films
 Columbus (2015 film), an Indian comedy, subtitled "Discovering Love"
 Columbus (2017 film), an American drama set amidst the architecture of Columbus, Indiana
 Columbus (Star Trek), a shuttlecraft in the Star Trek series

Music

Opera
 Columbus (Egk), German-language opera by Egk, 1943
Columbus, 1855 opera by František Škroup
 Christophe Colomb, French-language opera by Milhaud often referred to as Columbus in English sources

Other uses in music
 Columbus (Herzogenberg), large scale cantata by Heinrich von Herzogenberg 1870
"Colombus", song by Mary Black from No Frontiers
 "Columbus" (song), a song by the band Kent from their album Tillbaka till samtiden
 Christopher Columbus, pastiche of music by Offenbach to a new English libretto by Don White recorded by the Opera Rara label in 1977

Other uses in arts, entertainment, and media
 Columbus (novel), a 1941 novel about Christopher Columbus by Rafael Sabatini
 Columbus (Bartholdi), a statue depicting Christopher Columbus by Frédéric Auguste Bartholdi, in Providence, Rhode Island, US
 Columbus Edwards, the character known as Lum of Lum and Abner

Brands and enterprises
 COLUMBUS, ab initio quantum chemistry software
 ColumBus, former name of Howard Transit in Howard County, Maryland
 Columbus Communications, a cable television and broadband speed Internet service provider in the Caribbean region
 Columbus Salame, an American food processing company
 Columbus Tubing, an Italian manufacturer of bicycle frame tubing
 Columbus Buggy Company, an American automotive manufacturer from 1875 to 1913

Ships
 Columbus (1824), a disposable ship built to transport lumber from North America to Britain
 MS Columbus, a cruise ship owned by Plantours & Partner GmbH
 MV Columbus, a cruise ship owned by Seajets
 SS Christopher Columbus, Great Lakes excursion liner (1893–1933)
 SS City of Columbus, a passenger steamer that sailed from Boston to Savannah and sank off Martha's Vineyard in 1884
 SS Columbus (1873), an American merchantman converted in 1878 into the Russian cruiser Asia
 SS Columbus (1924), a transatlantic ocean liner for the North German Lloyd steamship line
 USS Columbus, various ships of the US Navy

Other uses 
 Columbus hops, a variety of hops
 Generation of Columbuses, a generation of Poles born ca. 1920, who had to fight twenty years later
 Columbus (shopping centre), a shopping centre in Vuosaari, Helsinki, Finland

See also 

 Christopher Columbus (disambiguation)
 Columbus City Hall (disambiguation)
 Columba
 Columbia (disambiguation)
 Columbus Day
 List of places named for Christopher Columbus